DJ Puzzle (real name Jason Everett Donnelly) is an American DJ, composer, music producer, remixer, and sound designer. He founded Peace Love Productions, a producer of royalty-free sounds for loop-based music software, in 2001. He sold Peace Love Productions to Mbira Technologies in 2008 and started a new company, Soundtrack Loops, with business partner Matthew Yost. In 2009, he signed a publishing contract with Reverbnation and APM Music in Hollywood to be one of thirteen artists chosen for the Reverbnation music library. Since then, he has composed songs for TV shows such as Wicked Tuna and for an Oculus VR exclusive virtual reality video game called Damaged Core by High Voltage Software.

Video games

 Damaged Core Oculus VR High Voltage Software 2016
 Tom Clancy's The Division Larae Barrett Lexington Event Center PS4, Xbox One, Switch, PC Massive Entertainment 2016
 Zombieland: Double Tap - Road Trip PS4, Xbox One, Switch, PC High Voltage Software 2019
 Roblox BlackHawk rescue mission 5 PS4, Xbox One, Switch, PC, mobile Roblox Corporation 2019

Film Scores
REFORM by Jamal Caesar - 2012 Blackash Blue Pictures

PROGRESS by Jamal Caesar - 2015 HBO, Best Boy Productions, Blackash Blue Pictures

Music On TV
 As The Record Turns - Jefferson's Secret Bible on Smithsonian Channel
 Class Soiree - Portlandia (TV series) Season 1, Episode 6 on IFC (U.S. TV channel)
 God Knows - Anthony Bourdain: Parts Unknown Season 5, Episode 8 on CNN
 Suspended On A Line - Wicked Tuna Season 4, Episode 10 National Geographic Channel
 80s Metal 5 120 BPM with Stacey Blades - The Rainbow Bar and Grill Documentary

Selected discography

Compilations, Singles, & Albums
 Emoticon
 Jah Boogie - Power (Dj Puzzle Club Mix)
 MYU Entertainment - TMRW - (Dj Puzzle Remix)
 Geodesic Peers Disc 1 and 2
 Summer Daze; New Sound Theory BasicLUX Records
 Shoong, Don't Let Em Catch Ya Alive; Precipice Recordings
 Lose Control - Solar Sound Records
 Lose Control - 20 Must-Hear House Tunes;Club Traxx
 Steam Roller - Twisted Angel The Official Christmas Dubstep Party - One Sound Records
 Karmacoda - Love Will Turn Your Head Around (Dj Puzzle Remix)
 Karmacoda - Leaving You (DJ Puzzle Remix)
 Drop It Low EP - MalLabel
 Illustrated - Traitors (Dj Puzzle Remix) - Play Me Records
 The Sky, The Sea, and the Unseen - Solar Sound Records
 Light Web - Solar Sound Records
 Defender - Solar Sound Records

iPad, iPhone, & iPod Touch Apps
 Midi Sequences & Synths Patches For Gruvtron By Sound Trends
 Loops for Looptastic & Studio.HD by Sound Trends
 Jah Boogie - Power (Dj Puzzle's Club Mix) Meta.Dj App By Sound Trends.
 Trap - iPro.DJSampler By iThirtySeven Pty Ltd

Music Software for PC
 Loops as part of the Mixcraft Software by Acoustica
 Loops on the Acid Dj 3.0 content disc
 Loops on PreSonus Studio One Version 2

Sample CDs and Sample Packs
 Tribal House; Loopmasters
 Dirty Disco: Nouveau Break Beat; Sony Creative Software
 Afterhours EDM; Sony Creative Software
 ACID DJ Expander Pack; Sony Creative Software
 Designer Dance Tools; Sony Creative Software
 Dj Puzzle: Scratch Tactics; Sony Creative Software
 Trance Sold NRG; Sony Creative Software
 Trance Sold NRG2; Sony Creative Software
 X-Core: Hardcore Techno Construction Kit; Sony Creative Software
 Dj Puzzle: Dubstep Complete; Sony Creative Software
 Complex Electro Funk; Sony Creative Software
 Smoldering Scores; Sony Creative Software
 Dj Puzzle: Urban Vibes; Magix Software GmbH
 Dj Puzzle: Trap Melodies; Magix Software GmbH
 Lo-Fi Trap; Roland Corporation
 Deepest House Auto-Tune

References
Interview: "Sonic TALK Special - Jason Donnelly Library Music Composer"
"Retronyms Artist Spotlight: DJ Puzzle"
"Dave Smith Instruments Artist Spotlight: DJ Puzzle"

External links
 http://www.djpuzzle.com – Dj Puzzle official homepage
 http://www.peaceloveproductions.com – Royalty free music loops
 https://www.imdb.com/name/nm4591965/ Dj Puzzle on IMDb

1973 births
Living people
American DJs
American dance musicians
American electronic musicians
Club DJs
Electronic dance music DJs